Le Casse (US title: The Burglars) is a 1971 French-Italian neo noir crime film directed by director Henri Verneuil and starring Jean-Paul Belmondo and Omar Sharif. It is based on the 1953 novel by David Goodis and revolves around a team of four burglars chased by a corrupt policeman in Athens. It's a remake of the 1957 film The Burglar with Jayne Mansfield.

The movie is known for its spectacular car chase and Belmondo's incredible fall from a construction truck down a steep, rocky hillside. The movie was shot twice, once in French and once in English, by the same cast.

Plot
In Athens, Azad (Jean-Paul Belmondo), Ralph (Robert Hossein) and 2 other accomplices, Renzi and Helen, steal a suitcase of emeralds from a rich Greek citizen, M.Tasco, when the latter is away on vacation.

The thieves break into the house, manage to open the safe, and escape with the jewels. A police detective, Abel Zacharia (Omar Sharif), spots the burglars’ car in front of the house. Azad chats with the detective telling a cover story of being a salesman with engine trouble. Zacharia leaves and Azad thinks he has gotten away with it.

The thieves plan to leave the country immediately on a merchant ship. However when they arrive at the dock they discover the ship is undergoing repairs and will not be ready for five days. They hide the money, split up, and agree to wait out the delay.

Zacharia reappears, having decided to find and keep the emeralds himself. Azad falls in love with Lena.

Zacharia identifies the thieves and kills Renzi, seeing to it that Ralph seems guilty of the crime.

Azad narrowly escapes the police with Lena, but he soon discovers that she is conspiring with Zacharia.

Ralph is arrested by police.

Cast
 Jean-Paul Belmondo as Azad  
 Omar Sharif as Abel Zacharia
 Dyan Cannon as Lena Gripp's 
 Robert Hossein as Ralph 
 Nicole Calfan as Helene
 Myriam Feune de Colombi as Isabelle Tasco (as Myriam Colombi)
 Raoul Delfosse as Le gardien de la villa Tasco
 José Luis de Vilallonga as Tasco
 Renato Salvatori as Renzi

Production
The Burglar by David Goodis had been published in 1953 and filmed in 1956. Goodis was popular with French filmmakers; his novel Down There had been adapted by François Truffaut as Shoot the Piano Player (1961).

Filming took place in Athens and Paris.

Reception
The film was a box office hit in France, being the sixth most popular movie of the year.

The Los Angeles Times said "the scenery is lovely, Belmondo is fun to watch even in a flat, silly part like this" but that it was "finally an uninteresting and uninvolving movie" because "it has no reality except as a movie".

The New York Times called it "yet another international caper film... that does nothing very well and almost everything in excess" in which the director would "fill up a great deal of film time with a device rather than with an action".

Time Out said the film "suffers an overdose of sunshine and multi-national production values to emerge as just another glossy heist."

References

External links 
 
 
 
 
 Le Casse at filmsdefrance.com
 Review of film at Cinema Retro

1970s crime action films
1971 films
1970s chase films
Films scored by Ennio Morricone
Films directed by Henri Verneuil
Films set in Athens
Films shot in Greece
Films shot in Athens
French crime action films
French multilingual films
Italian multilingual films
French heist films
French remakes of American films
Columbia Pictures films
Films based on American novels
Italian heist films
1970s heist films
English-language Italian films
1970s French-language films
1971 multilingual films
1970s Italian films
1970s French films